The 1998 California Superintendent of Public Instruction election occurred on March 3, 1998. Incumbent Delaine Eastin defeated Gloria Matta Tuchman, Barbara Carpenter, Mark Isler, and Miles Everett.

Results

Results by county

See also
1998 California elections
State of California
California Department of Education

External links

VoteCircle.com Non-partisan resources & vote sharing network for Californians
Information on the elections from California's Secretary of State

1998 California elections
California Superintendent of Public Instruction elections
California